Yasushi Miyake (born 26 February 1974) is a Japanese wrestler. He competed in the men's Greco-Roman 68 kg at the 1996 Summer Olympics.

References

1974 births
Living people
Japanese male sport wrestlers
Olympic wrestlers of Japan
Wrestlers at the 1996 Summer Olympics
Sportspeople from Tokyo
Asian Wrestling Championships medalists
20th-century Japanese people